This is a list of free television software, and includes television-related software which is distributed as free software – under a free software licence, with the source code available.

Notable free television software

 Aegisub - subtitle editing software 
 GeeXboX 
 Kdetv 
 Kodi (formerly XBMC)
 Jellyfin
 LinHES 
 LinuxMCE 
 LinuxTV 
 MediaPortal 
 Mythbuntu 
 MythTV 
 SubRip 
 Video disk recorder
 Xawtv 
 ZoneMinder

See also

 Comparison of PVR software packages
 List of free and open-source software packages
 List of Internet television providers
 List of online video platforms
 List of smart TV platforms

 
Television